Catherine of Cilli is a female noble name may refer to:

Catherine of Bosnia, Countess of Cilli (c. 1336 – c. 1396), wife of Herman I
Katarina Branković (1418–1492/1419–c. 1490), countess of Cilli

See also 
Cilli (disambiguation)